The Chinese water myotis (Myotis laniger) is a species of vesper bat. It is native to eastern India, Vietnam and China where it is found in forest habitats. It is believed to roost in caves and hollow trees.

References

Mouse-eared bats
Mammals described in 1871
Taxa named by Wilhelm Peters
Bats of Asia